Scott O'Neill may refer to:

Scott O'Neill, musician in Peakin' Trippers
Scott O'Neill (OITNB), fictional character in Orange Is the New Black